Ondřej Liška (born 14 July 1977 in Brno) is a Czech politician, who served as Minister of Education under Prime Minister Mirek Topolánek in his second cabinet. He was a member of the Chamber of Deputies for South Moravia from the 2006 legislative election until May 2010. He was the chairman of the Green Party.

External links 
 Homepage
 Official biography

1977 births
Living people
Education ministers of the Czech Republic
Members of the Chamber of Deputies of the Czech Republic (2006–2010)
Politicians from Brno
Leaders of the Green Party (Czech Republic)
Masaryk University alumni
Green Party (Czech Republic) Government ministers